Garachiné is a corregimiento in Chepigana District, Darién Province, Panama with a population of 1,878 as of 2010. Its population as of 1990 was 1,800; its population as of 2000 was 1,944.

Transportation 
The village is served by the Garachiné Airport .

References

Corregimientos of Darién Province
Populated places in Darién Province
Road-inaccessible communities of Panama